Josh Santacaterina (born 21 May 1980) is a World Champion open water swimmer from Australia. At the 2006 Open Water Worlds, he won the Men's 25 km race.

He has swum for Australia at the:
World Championships: 2003, 2005, 2007
Open Water Worlds: 2000, 2004, 2006, 2008

References

1980 births
Living people
Male long-distance swimmers
Australian male swimmers
20th-century Australian people
21st-century Australian people